South East Cambridgeshire is a constituency represented in the House of Commons of the UK Parliament since 2015 by Lucy Frazer, a member of the Conservative Party who has served as the Culture Secretary since 2023. It was established for the 1983 general election.

The constituency has always been based on the cathedral city of Ely.

History
The constituency was created in 1983 from parts of the former seats of Cambridgeshire and Isle of Ely. Its first MP, Francis Pym, was a Conservative Cabinet Minister, serving in roles such as Secretary of State for Northern Ireland (1973–1974) in the Heath government and Secretary of State for Defence (1979–1981), Leader of the House of Commons (1981–1982) and most prominently Foreign Secretary (1982–1983, during the Falklands War) under Margaret Thatcher. However, during the four years he served South East Cambridgeshire, he was a Tory 'wet' backbencher, having been sacked by Thatcher for famously remarking during the 1983 election that "Landslides don't on the whole produce successful governments".

It has to date been a safe Conservative seat, although in 2010 the margin was cut to a relatively small 10.3% by the Liberal Democrat candidate (possibly helped by controversies surrounding the Labour candidate). In 2015 and 2017 Labour achieved the largest increase in their share of the vote; in 2017 they achieved their highest ever vote share in the seat (27.7%) and overtook the Liberal Democrats for the first time since 1997; despite this, the Conservatives achieved over 50% of the vote in the seat for the first time since 1992.

According to approximate analysis of the 2016 EU membership referendum, South East Cambridgeshire (which is made up of wards from East Cambridgeshire District Council, which voted 51% to leave, as well as South Cambridgeshire District Council, which voted 60% to remain) voted 54% to remain in the EU.

Constituency profile

The constituency is predominantly low-lying and agricultural, with many residents commuting to work in Cambridge. Workless claimants were in November 2012 significantly lower than the national average of 3.8%, at 1.4% of the population based on a statistical compilation by The Guardian.

Boundaries and boundary changes 

1983–1997: The District of East Cambridgeshire wards of Bottisham, Burwell, Cheveley, Dullingham Villages, Ely North, Ely South, Ely West, Fordham Villages, Isleham, Soham, The Swaffhams, and Woodditton, and the District of South Cambridgeshire wards of Abington, Balsham, Bar Hill, Castle Camps, Coton, Cottenham, Elsworth, Fulbourn, Girton, Histon, Linton, Longstanton, Milton, Over, Swavesey, Teversham, The Wilbrahams, Waterbeach, and Willingham.

The seat was created for the 1983 general election which followed on from the merger under the Local Government Act 1972, of the two administrative counties of Huntingdon and Peterborough and Cambridgeshire and Isle of Ely to form the non-metropolitan county of Cambridgeshire, with effect from 1 April 1974.  It was formed from eastern parts of the abolished County Constituency of Cambridgeshire, together with the city of Ely, which had been in the abolished County Constituency of Isle of Ely.

1997–2010: The District of East Cambridgeshire wards of Bottisham, Burwell, Cheveley, Dullingham Villages, Ely North, Ely South, Ely West, Fordham Villages, Haddenham, Isleham, Soham, Stretham, The Swaffhams, Witchford, and Woodditton, and the District of South Cambridgeshire wards of Abington, Balsham, Castle Camps, Cottenham, Fulbourn, Histon, Linton, Milton, Over, Teversham, The Wilbrahams, Waterbeach, and Willingham.

The westernmost area was transferred to the new County Constituency of South Cambridgeshire.  Minor gain from North East Cambridgeshire.

2010–present: The District of East Cambridgeshire wards of Bottisham, Burwell, Cheveley, Dullingham Villages, Ely East, Ely North, Ely South, Ely West, Fordham Villages, Haddenham, Isleham, Soham North, Soham South, Stretham, and The Swaffhams, and the District of South Cambridgeshire wards of Balsham, Fulbourn, Histon and Impington, Linton, Milton, Teversham, The Wilbrahams, Waterbeach, and Willingham and Over.

Further minor loss to South Cambridgeshire.

The constituency includes the eastern half of South Cambridgeshire district and the southern part of East Cambridgeshire. Ely, the largest community, has cathedral city status, and there are many smaller settlements including Burwell, Fulbourn, Isleham, Linton, Milton, Soham and Waterbeach.

Members of Parliament

Elections

Elections in the 2010s

Edmund Fordham was originally the Brexit Party candidate for the Bury St Edmunds constituency in the 2019 general election.

Elections in the 2000s

Elections in the 1990s

Elections in the 1980s

See also
 List of parliamentary constituencies in Cambridgeshire

Notes

References

External links
 South East Cambridgeshire Conservative Association

Parliamentary constituencies in Cambridgeshire
Constituencies of the Parliament of the United Kingdom established in 1983